Nocardiopsis tropica  is a bacterium from the genus of Nocardiopsis.

References

Further reading 
 

Actinomycetales
Bacteria described in 2000